Sharipovo (Şärip) is a rural locality (a selo) in Meshchegarovsky Selsoviet, Salavatsky District, Bashkortostan, Russia. The population was 420 as of 2010. There are 4 streets.

Geography 
Sharipovo is located 44 km north of Maloyaz (the district's administrative centre) by road. Meshchegarovo is the nearest rural locality.

References 

Rural localities in Salavatsky District